Hainamuli is a 2009 Bodo Comedy film directed by Phaylaw Basumatary. It stars Jwngsrang Brahma, Dwimasa Brahma, Jagat Boro and Riju Brahma in leading roles. The film was released in 2009, produced by Bangbula Film Production Presents.

Hainamuli is the best comedy film in the Bodo film industry. The film is debut of Jwngrang Brahma, Dwimasa Brahma and Riju Brahma. In 2010, a direct sequel title Hainamuli 2 was released.

Plot

Cast

Music

See also
 Bodo films

References

Indian comedy films
2009 films